Olmstead Pond is a lake located northeast of Wanakena, New York. The outflow creek flows into Six Mile Creek. Fish species present in the pond are brown bullhead, and brook trout. Access via trail from West Flow Bay of Cranberry Lake on the south shore. No motors are allowed on Olmstead Pond.

References

Lakes of New York (state)
Lakes of St. Lawrence County, New York